The Mexican Open, also known as the Mexico Open and Abierto Mexicano de Golf, is the national open golf tournament of Mexico.

History
First played  in 1944 at the Club de Golf Chapultepec, it was an event on the Tour de las Américas between 2003 and 2006, being co-sanctioned by the European Challenge Tour from 2004 to 2006. It became a Nationwide Tour event in 2008, and was rescheduled from December to January, which resulted in no tournament in 2007. Due to the outbreak of swine flu in 2009, the Mexican Open was rescheduled from May to September. In 2013, the tournament was moved to March and became an official event for PGA Tour Latinoamérica. The tournament would also be moved to Club de Golf Mexico. 

In 2022, the tournament became an official event on the PGA Tour, with a purse of $7,300,000 and awarding 500 FedEx Cup points to the winner.

Winners

Notes

References

External links
 
List of winners
Coverage on the European Tour's official site (2004–06)
Coverage on the PGA Tour's official site

Golf tournaments in Mexico
PGA Tour Latinoamérica events
Former Korn Ferry Tour events
Former Challenge Tour events
Former Tour de las Américas events
Recurring sporting events established in 1944
Spring (season) events in Mexico
1944 establishments in Mexico